The Gnome 7 Omega (commonly called the Gnome 50 hp) is a French seven-cylinder, air-cooled aero engine produced by Gnome et Rhône. It was shown at the Paris Aero Salon held in December 1908 and was first flown in 1909. It was the world's first aviation  rotary engine produced in quantity. Its introduction revolutionized the aviation industry and it was used by many early aircraft. It produced  from its  engine capacity. A Gnome Omega engine powers the 1912 Blackburn Monoplane, owned and operated by the Shuttleworth Collection, the oldest known airworthy British-designed aeroplane worldwide. A two-row version of the same engine was also produced, known as the Gnome 14 Omega-Omega or Gnome 100 hp.  The prototype Omega engine still exists, and is on display at the United States' National Air and Space Museum.

Like all early Gnome et Rhône engines the Omega featured a single pushrod driven exhaust valve on the cylinder head; the intake valve was located in the piston crown, opening by inertia on the downstroke and feeding the intake charge from the crankcase into the upper part of the cylinder.  No throttle was provided, the pilot controlling his speed by switching off the ignition when necessary.

Variants
Gnome 7 OmegaSingle-row 7-cyl. original version; .
Gnome 14 Omega-Omega
Two-row, 14-cylinder version using Omega cylinders; .

Applications

Gnome 7 Omega
 

A Vlaicu I
A Vlaicu II
ASL Valkyrie
Avro Type 500
Avro-Burga Monoplane
Blackburn Mercury
Blackburn Type D Monoplane
Blériot XI
Breguet Type III
Breguet Type IV
Bristol Boxkite
Bristol Racing Biplane
Bristol Monoplane
Bristol-Prier P.1
Bristol-Coanda School Monoplane
Bristol-Coanda T.B.8
Castaibert III
Caudron Type B

Deperdussin 1910 monoplane
François Denhaut's flying boat
Fabre Hydravion
Farman HF.6 Militaire
Farman III
FBA Type A
Grahame-White Type VII
Grahame-White Type XV
Howard Wright 1910 Biplane 
Koolhoven Heidevogel
Lakes Waterbird
London and Provincial Fuselage Biplane 
Morane-Borel monoplane
Nieuport II
Paalson Type 1 
Paulhan-Tatin Aéro-Torpille No.1
Paulhan biplane
Pemberton-Billing P.B.9

Radley-England waterplanes
Royal Aircraft Factory B.E.3 
Royal Aircraft Factory B.E.4 
Royal Aircraft Factory F.E.2
Sommer 1910 biplane
Short S.27
Short Tandem Twin
Short Triple Twin
Short S.47 Triple Tractor
Short S.62
Sopwith Bee
Sopwith Sparrow
Van Meel Brikken
Vickers No.6 Monoplane
Vickers No.7 Monoplane
Vickers Boxkite School Biplane
Voisin 1907 biplane
Voisin Type de Course

Gnome 14 Omega-Omega
Avro 501
Blériot XIII
Bleriot XXIII
Bristol-Gordon England G.E.2
Coventry Ordnance Works Biplane 10
Deperdussin 1912 Racing Monoplane
Nieuport IV.H floatplane
Short S.41 Tractor Biplane
Short S.57 Seaplane
Short S.64 Folder Seaplane
Short Admiralty Type 74

Engines on display
The very first Gnome rotary engine ever built, Gnôme Omega No. 1, is on display at the National Air and Space Museum, Washington, D.C.
A preserved production Gnome 7 Omega engine is on public display at the Royal Air Force Museum London.
A restored Omega is on display at the New England Air Museum, Windsor Locks, CT.

Specifications (7 Omega)

See also

Footnotes

References

Further reading

External links

 NASM's page on Gnome Omega No.1
 Video of April 2009 ground runup of a restored Gnome Omega in the USA

Omega
Air-cooled aircraft piston engines
1900s aircraft piston engines
Rotary aircraft piston engines